Bank Respublika is a private commercial bank established on May 22, 1992 based on a license issued by the National Bank of Azerbaijan Republic. As of June 1, 2011, the bank's total capital exceeded 53.7 million Azerbaijani manat (₼) (US$31.6 million) and total assets reached ₼294.2 million (US$173.0 million).

Shareholders
One of the most important achievements of Bank Respublika is the equity investment in the Bank by Germany's two large financial institutions: Investment Company DEG, a member of KfW banking group, and Sparkassen International Development Trust (SIDT), a member of financial group Sparkassen-Finanzgruppe. The relevant agreements were signed between the parties on April 28, 2005 in Bank Respublika's head office.

Pursuant to the agreements, Investment Company DEG, a member of KfW banking group, and SIDT, a member of financial group Sparkassen-Finanzgruppe, acquired a package of Bank Respublika's shares of "25%+1 share".

Structure of Bank Respublika's shareholder equity:

Local shareholders – 75%
Investment Company DEG – 16.7%
Sparkassen International Development Trust – 8.3%

See also

 Banking in Azerbaijan
 Central Bank of Azerbaijan
 List of banks in Azerbaijan
 Azerbaijani manat
 Economy of Azerbaijan

References

External links

Bank Respublika web site

Government of Azerbaijan
Economy of Azerbaijan
Banks of Azerbaijan
Banks established in 1992